The 1979 Prague Skate was held in November 1979. Medals were awarded in the disciplines of men's singles, ladies' singles, pair skating, and ice dancing.

Men

Ladies

Pairs

Ice dancing

References

Prague Skate
Prague Skate